The crowned chat-tyrant (Silvicultrix frontalis) is a species of bird in the tyrant flycatcher family.

Taxonomy
Clements splits this species, with the subspecies frontalis, albidiadema and orientalis remaining as crowned chat-tyrant, and spodionota and boliviana becoming Peruvian chat-tyrant, Ochthoeca spodionota.

Distribution and habitat
It is found in Bolivia, Colombia, Ecuador, and Peru. Its natural habitat is subtropical or tropical moist montane forests.

References

crowned chat-tyrant
Birds of the Northern Andes
crowned chat-tyrant
Taxonomy articles created by Polbot